The University of Toronto has had 34 chancellors since it was founded in 1827 as King's College.

List of chancellors

References

University of Toronto people
Toronto
Toronto-related lists